Blang Mangat is a district in Lhokseumawe, Aceh, Indonesia.

Administrative divisions 
list the name of the village (Gampong) is in Districts of Blang Mangat

 Gampong Alue Lim (postcode : 24375)
 Gampong Asan Kareung (postcode : 24375)
 Gampong Baloy (postcode : 24375)
 Gampong Blang Buloh (postcode : 24375)
 Gampong Blang Cut (postcode : 24375)
 Gampong Blang Punteut (postcode : 24375)
 Gampong Blang Teue (postcode : 24375)
 Gampong Blang Weu Baroh (postcode : 24375)
 Gampong Blang Weu Panjou (postcode : 24375)
 Gampong Jambo Mesjid(postcode : 24375)
 Gampong Jambo Timu (postcode : 24375)
 Gampong Jeulikat (postcode : 24375)
 Gampong Keude Punteut (postcode : 24375)
 Gampong Kuala Meuraksa (postcode : 24375)
 Gampong Kumbang Punteut (postcode : 24375)
 Gampong Mane Kareung (postcode : 24375)
 Gampong Mesjid Meuraksa (postcode : 24375)
 Gampong Mesjid Punteut (postcode : 24375)
 Gampong Rayeuk Kareung (postcode : 24375)
 Gampong Seuneubok (postcode : 24375)
 Gampong Teungoh (postcode : 24375)
 Gampong Tunong (postcode : 24375)
 Gampong Ulee Blang Mane (postcode : 24375)

References 

Lhokseumawe
Populated places in Aceh
districts of Lhokseumawe